Virgin white tea is a white tea of Sri Lankan origin.

History
The concept of the virgin white tea is found in Chinese mythology. The virgin white tea is considered as one of the most expensive teas in the world.

Health effects
The virigin white tea is considered rich in antioxidants.

Plantations
Weligama, Sri Lanka is well-known for virigin white tea plantations.

References

Sri Lankan tea